In geology, range offset is the time difference between the last fossil occurrence of a taxon and the actual disappearance of this taxon. Range offset can be used as a measure of biostratigraphic precision and determines among others how much information about extinctions can be derived from fossil occurrences.

Definition 
The range offset of a taxon is defined as 
 the time span between the moment in which the highest stratigraphic occurrence of said taxon was deposited and the moment in which the taxon disappeared from the locality or area and/or
 the time span between the moment the taxon appears for the first time in the locality or area and the moment in which the lowest stratigraphic occurrence of said taxon was deposited.

Effects of sequence stratigraphy 
Range offset is strongly affected by sequence stratigraphy. Simulations show that range offset changes by up to three orders of magnitude dependent on the position in the systems tracts.

References 

Biostratigraphy
Paleobiology
Sequence stratigraphy